In enzymology, a glutamate 5-kinase is an enzyme that catalyzes the chemical reaction

ATP + L-glutamate  ADP + L-glutamate 5-phosphate

Thus, the two substrates of this enzyme are ATP and L-glutamate, whereas its two products are ADP and L-glutamate 5-phosphate.

This enzyme belongs to the family of transferases, specifically those transferring phosphorus-containing groups (phosphotransferases) with a carboxy group as acceptor.  The systematic name of this enzyme class is ATP:L-glutamate 5-phosphotransferase. Other names in common use include ATP-L-glutamate 5-phosphotransferase, ATP:gamma-L-glutamate phosphotransferase, gamma-glutamate kinase, gamma-glutamyl kinase, and glutamate kinase.  This enzyme participates in urea cycle and metabolism of amino groups.

Structural studies

References 

 

EC 2.7.2
Enzymes of known structure